Monday Emoghavwe (born 2 April 1963) is a Nigerian powerlifter. He represented Nigeria at the 1992 Summer Paralympics, at the 1996 Summer Paralympics and at the 2000 Summer Paralympics. He won the gold medal three times: he won the gold medal in the Men's 48 kg event at the 1992 Summer Paralympics, Men's 60 kg event at the 1996 Summer Paralympics and he also won the gold medal in the Men's 67.5 kg event at the 2000 Summer Paralympics. He also won a gold medal during the 1995 All-Africa Games held in Harare, Zimbabwe.

Emoghavwe also serves as president of the Nigeria Paralympic Committee. In 2018, he received the Distinguished Merit Award by the Nigeria Olympic Committee.

Notes

References 

Living people
1963 births
Paralympic powerlifters of Nigeria
Nigerian powerlifters
Powerlifters at the 1992 Summer Paralympics
Powerlifters at the 1996 Summer Paralympics
Powerlifters at the 2000 Summer Paralympics
Medalists at the 1992 Summer Paralympics
Medalists at the 1996 Summer Paralympics
Medalists at the 2000 Summer Paralympics
Paralympic gold medalists for Nigeria
African Games competitors for Nigeria
Competitors at the 1995 All-Africa Games
Paralympic medalists in powerlifting
20th-century Nigerian people
21st-century Nigerian people